Eduard Julius Ludwig von Lewinski  (22 February 1829 – 17 September 1906) was a Prussian general. His younger brother Alfred von Lewinski also became a Prussian general.

Von Lewinski was born in Münster in the Province of Westphalia. He served in the 1864 Second Schleswig War as captain of the 1st Guards Fortress Company, and received the prestigious Pour le Mérite. In the Austro-Prussian War he was assigned to the 1st Division as a staff officer. In 1867 Lewinski was promoted to major on the general staff. He later served in the Franco-Prussian War, first on the staff of the 1st Division and later as Quartermaster-General of the South Army. In 1871 he became chief of staff of the IX Corps. In 1872 he was promoted to lieutenant colonel and assumed command of the 24th Artillery Regiment.

Further steps in his military career included:
 1877 Commander of the 2nd Field artillery brigade
 1880 Promoted to major general
 1884 Named Inspector-General of the 2nd Field Artillery Inspection
 1885 Promoted to lieutenant general
 1889 Appointed Commanding General of the VI Corps
 1890 Promoted to General of the Artillery
 1895 Retired from the army

Von Lewinski died in Burgwitz Trebnitz.

He and his wife Helene Pauline von Sperling were the biological parents of future Field Marshal Erich von Manstein (1887–1973), who was adopted at birth by childless relatives General Georg von Manstein and Hedwig von Sperling, sister to Helene. A third von Sperling daughter, Gertrud, was married to Paul von Hindenburg.

Honours and awards
  Kingdom of Prussia:
 Pour le Mérite (military), 7 June 1864; with Oak Leaves, 3 March 1871
 Knight of the Order of the Red Eagle, 4th Class with Swords, 1866; 2nd Class with Oak Leaves and Swords on Ring, 18 January 1883; 1st Class, 20 September 1890
 Iron Cross (1870), 1st Class
 Knight of the Royal Order of the Crown, 2nd Class, 16 September 1879
   Sweden-Norway: Commander Grand Cross of the Order of the Sword, 8 September 1888

References

1829 births
1906 deaths
German untitled nobility
Military personnel from Münster
People from the Province of Westphalia
Generals of Artillery (Prussia)
German military personnel of the Franco-Prussian War
Prussian people of the Austro-Prussian War
Recipients of the Pour le Mérite (military class)
Recipients of the Iron Cross (1870), 1st class
Commanders Grand Cross of the Order of the Sword